Scott MacKenzie may refer to:

Scott MacKenzie (snooker player) (born 1980), Scottish professional snooker player
Scott MacKenzie (footballer) (born 1970), retired professional footballer
Scott MacKenzie (darts player) (born 1972), darts player from Hong Kong

See also 
Scott McKenzie (1939–2012), American singer
MacKenzie Scott (born 1970), American businesswoman and novelist